Mike Conley (27 September 1860 – 14 March 1920) was a late 1800s professional heavyweight boxer. He was born in Towanda, Pennsylvania, but resided in Ithaca, New York, where he was known as the "Ithaca Giant". He was described as a bona fide heavyweight with a "heavyweight" punch. He was reportedly the Heavyweight Champion of the Northwest. His greatest weakness as a boxer was said to be his lack of boxing finesse. An image of Conley is widely used in Internet memes commonly referred to as "Overly Manly Man".

References

1860 births
1920 deaths
American male boxers
People from Towanda, Pennsylvania
Heavyweight boxers